The Custodian of the Standard Book of Common Prayer is a canonical office in some Anglican churches, including the Anglican Church of Canada and The Episcopal Church, responsible for maintaining official texts of the Book of Common Prayer.

Custodians in Canada
William James Armitage (February 6, 1860 – 1929)

Custodians in the United States
The office was established in 1892 by the General Convention, when the First Standard Book was also adopted.
 Benjamin Isaac Haight, 1868–1879
 Francis Harrison, 1880–1885
 Samuel Hart, 1886–1917
 Lucien Moore Robinson, 1917–1933
 John Wallace Suter, 1934–1942
 John Wallace Suter, Jr., 1942–1962
 Charles Mortimer Guilbert, 1963-1998
 Gregory Michael Howe, 2000-2015
 Juan M. Cabrero-Oliver, 2015–2022
 J. Neil Alexander, 2022–present

References

Episcopal Church (United States)
Book of Common Prayer
Anglican Church of Canada